Trichopternoides is a monotypic genus of European sheet weavers containing the single species, Trichopternoides thorelli. It was first described by J. Wunderlich in 2008, and is only found in Europe.

See also
 List of Linyphiidae species (Q–Z)

References

Linyphiidae
Monotypic Araneomorphae genera
Palearctic spiders